Fern-Marylyn Apartments is a historic apartment complex in Ogden, Utah. It includes two buildings: Marylyn Apartments on the southern side completed in 1923, and Fern Apartments on the northern side completed in 1926. It has been listed on the National Register of Historic Places since December 31, 1987.

References

National Register of Historic Places in Weber County, Utah
Residential buildings completed in 1923
1923 establishments in Utah
Buildings and structures in Ogden, Utah